Avren Municipality is a seaside municipality (obshtina) in Varna Province, Northeastern Bulgaria. It is named after its administrative centre – the village of Avren.

Its area spreads from Provadiya Municipality in the west to the Bulgarian Black Sea Coast in the east. To the south the municipality is mostly defined by the Kamchiya river and its estuary.

Settlements 

Avren Municipality includes the following 17 places, all of them are villages:

Demography 
The following table shows the change of the population during the last four decades.

Religion
According to the latest Bulgarian census of 2011, the religious composition, among those who answered the optional question on religious identification, was the following:

A majority of the population of Avren Municipality identify themselves as Christians. At the 2011 census, 62.3% of respondents identified as Orthodox Christians belonging to the Bulgarian Orthodox Church. There is a relatively large Muslim minority and a large part did not answer.

See also
Provinces of Bulgaria
Municipalities of Bulgaria
List of cities and towns in Bulgaria

References

External links
 Official website 

Municipalities in Varna Province